Eric Morris (born November 19, 1931) is an American actor, acting teacher and author who founded his own theory of acting based on the works of Lee Strasberg and Martin Landau. Eric's passion for truth and authenticity drove him to create the Eric Morris System of Acting, which provides actors with concrete techniques to explore their own psychology as the underlying source of their challenges - and unique gifts - as actors.

Early life
His parents were Russian Immigrants. His father emigrated from Russia to the United States in 1912. Morris lived with his family in various apartments in a neighborhood inhabited chiefly by Jewish immigrants from Russia or Poland until, in seventh grade, when his father bought a house.

He spent some years as a Boy Scout, attaining the rank of Star Scout. He was a soda jerk at Walgreens, and at age fourteen spent some Saturdays doing stand-up comedy at a mafia nightclub.  After a false start and a detour in therapy, Morris returned to Wright Junior College in 1950 and took up drama.  He enrolled at Northwestern University School of Speech in 1952, as a junior theater major.  Alvina Krause taught him acting, though he reports she did not like him; he got a "C" in the class.  In 1978 he bought a house at Lake Arrowhead, fulfilling a wish he had made as a ten-year-old in 1941.

The Eric Morris System
Having published over six books in his theory, Morris claims that his System is derived partly from Lee Strasberg's Method Acting. However, Strasberg's Method focuses too much on craft, according to Morris, and not enough on the actor's instrument. Facing struggle in finding truth, he contemplated his theory while heading the Directors Unit at the Actor's Studio in Los Angeles. Morris' method recognizes the fact that actors have emotional blocks, tension, insecurities and other preventions to achieving a fundamental state of being, and works to clear these blocks, rendering the actor truly organic. In this sense, Morris stresses that acting is essentially living and being.

There are seven major obligations to material, according to Morris: 1) Time and Place, 2) Relationship, 3) Emotional Obligation, 4) Character Obligation, 5) Historic Obligation, 6) Thematic Obligation, 7) Subtextual Obligation. After recognizing these 7 obligations, there are the choices the actor utilizes to render these emotions, and finally the approach to which the actors use these choices.

The Eric Morris System has received praise from such actors as Jack Nicholson and Johnny Depp.

Acting career
Morris has been acting since 1949. He is an original member of the Screen Actors Guild since 1954. He has worked in over 100 equity plays on stages across the US, including such stages as the Globe Theater and Chicago Rep. Morris has also worked in several television shows, including Lawman, Days of Our Lives, Hogan's Heroes, The New Phil Silvers Show and Fame. Furthermore, Morris has worked in over 25 major motion pictures, including Pork Chop Hill, Battle Beyond the Stars and Mirage.

Filmography

Books

References

External links
 Eric Morris official website
 
 and more in this series...

1931 births
Living people
Actors Studio alumni
American male film actors
American male stage actors
American male television actors
Drama teachers
Male actors from Chicago
Northwestern University School of Communication alumni
Acting teachers
People from Lake Arrowhead, California
Wilbur Wright College alumni
American people of Russian descent